Mr. Wrong is a film starring Ellen DeGeneres and Bill Pullman.

Mr. Wrong may also refer to:
 Mr Wrong (1985 film), a New Zealand horror film
 Mr. Wrong, the side-project of Canadian musician Rob Wright of Nomeansno and the Hanson Brothers
 Mr. Wrong (Mr. Men), a character in the Mr. Men children's book series by Roger Hargreaves
 Mr. Wrong (song), a 2011 song by Mary J. Blige
 "Mr Wrong", a 1987 song by Sam Frazier Jr.